The Ford Godzilla engine is a V8 engine offered by the Ford Motor Company. The engine is intended to replace the Modular V10 engine and displaces the Boss V8 engine in many uses. The engine was first used with Ford Super Duty trucks starting with the 2020 model year and was later added to the Ford E-Series for the 2021 model year. It is also available as a crate engine. Exterior dimensions are smaller than the 385-series 460 engine, and slightly larger than those of the 351 Windsor engine.

Attributes
Camshaft: Variable valve timing
Piston: Hypereutectic aluminum alloy
Connecting rod: Cracked powdered metal
Crankshaft: Forged
No Variable displacement 
Knock sensors from the Ford Boss engine
Siamesed cylinders with saw cuts between cylinders to increase cooling capacity 
Variable oil pump for fuel economy

Because the engine uses overhead valves actuated by pushrods, it is smaller than many of the overhead camshaft Ford Modular engines, and can be fitted to older cars.

Variable tuning 
Ford offers several different ratings of the engines that can prioritize either performance or economy. More performance oriented tunings are intended as a replacement for the Modular V10 engine, while economy tunings replace the Boss V8 engine.

The E-Series offers two versions that were de-tuned even further.

6.8-liter variant 
A 6.8-liter version with the same bore as the 7.3-liter but a shorter stroke, has been introduced in the revamped 2023 Ford Super Duty F-Series pickups as a replacement for the discontinued 6.2-liter SOHC Boss V8.

Common Applications
2020–present Ford Super Duty (F-250/350/450/550/600) 
2020–present Ford F-650/750
2021–present Ford E-Series (E-350/450)
2020–present Ford F-53 Motorhome Stripped Chassis
2020–present Ford F-59 Commercial Stripped Chassis
2022–present Blue Bird Vision school bus

References 

Ford engines
V8 engines
Gasoline engines by model